Drebbel is a small lunar impact crater named after Cornelius Drebbel that is located to the northeast of the large walled plain Schickard, in the southwestern part of the Moon. Further to the northeast is the Lacus Excellentiae and the small crater Clausius.

The rim of this crater is roughly circular, with an outward bulge along the east and southeast side. Along this arc of the inner wall is a single terrace where the material has slumped downwards. The west and northwest sides have accumulations along the base where loose material has slumped to the floor. The remainder of the inner rim is a simple slope that runs down to the interior floor. The rim is relatively sharp-edged and not noticeably worn. There is a level interior floor that is just over half the crater diameter.

Satellite craters
By convention these features are identified on lunar maps by placing the letter on the side of the crater midpoint that is closest to Drebbel.

External links
 LAC-110, lunar chart from Gazetteer of Planetary Nomenclature

References

 
 
 
 
 
 
 
 
 
 
 
 

Impact craters on the Moon